The rufous-sided honeyeater (Ptiloprora erythropleura) is a species of bird in the family Meliphagidae.
It is endemic to West Papua, Indonesia.

Its natural habitat is subtropical or tropical moist montane forests.

References

Ptiloprora
Birds of Western New Guinea
Birds described in 1876
Taxonomy articles created by Polbot